Cultural algorithms (CA) are a branch of evolutionary computation where there is a knowledge component that is called the belief space in addition to the population component. In this sense, cultural algorithms can be seen as an extension to a conventional genetic algorithm. Cultural algorithms were introduced by Reynolds (see references).

Belief space 
The belief space of a cultural algorithm is divided into distinct categories. These categories represent different domains of knowledge that the population has of the search space.

The belief space is updated after each iteration by the best individuals of the population. The best individuals can be selected using a fitness function that assesses the performance of each individual in population much like in genetic algorithms.

List of belief space categories 

 Normative knowledge A collection of desirable value ranges for the individuals in the population component e.g. acceptable behavior for the agents in population.
 Domain specific knowledge Information about the domain of the cultural algorithm problem is applied to.
 Situational knowledge Specific examples of important events - e.g. successful/unsuccessful solutions
 Temporal knowledge History of the search space - e.g. the temporal patterns of the search process
 Spatial knowledge Information about the topography of the search space

Population
The population component of the cultural algorithm is approximately the same as that of the genetic algorithm.

Communication protocol 
Cultural algorithms require an interface between the population and belief space. The best individuals of the population can update the belief space via the update function. Also, the knowledge categories of the belief space can affect the population component via the influence function. The influence function can affect population by altering the genome or the actions of the individuals.

Pseudocode for cultural algorithms
 Initialize population space (choose initial population)
 Initialize belief space (e.g. set domain specific knowledge and normative value-ranges)
 Repeat until termination condition is met
 Perform actions of the individuals in population space
 Evaluate each individual by using the fitness function
 Select the parents to reproduce a new generation of offspring
 Let the belief space alter the genome of the offspring by using the influence function
 Update the belief space by using the accept function (this is done by letting the best individuals to affect the belief space)

Applications
Various optimization problems
Social simulation
Real-parameter optimization

See also 
Artificial intelligence
Artificial life
Evolutionary computation
Genetic algorithm
Harmony search
Machine learning
Memetic algorithm
Memetics
Metaheuristic
Social simulation
Sociocultural evolution
Stochastic optimization
Swarm intelligence

References 

 Robert G. Reynolds, Ziad Kobti, Tim Kohler: Agent-Based Modeling of Cultural Change in Swarm Using Cultural Algorithms
 R. G. Reynolds, “An Introduction to Cultural Algorithms, ” in Proceedings of the 3rd Annual Conference on Evolutionary Programming, World Scientific Publishing, pp 131–139, 1994.
 Robert G. Reynolds, Bin Peng. Knowledge Learning and Social Swarms in Cultural Systems. Journal of Mathematical Sociology. 29:1-18, 2005
 Reynolds, R. G., and Ali, M. Z, “Embedding a Social Fabric Component into Cultural Algorithms Toolkit for an Enhanced Knowledge-Driven Engineering Optimization”, International Journal of Intelligent Computing and Cybernetics (IJICC), Vol. 1, No 4, pp. 356–378, 2008
 Reynolds, R G., and Ali, M Z., Exploring Knowledge and Population Swarms via an Agent-Based Cultural Algorithms Simulation Toolkit (CAT), in proceedings of IEEE Congress on Computational Intelligence 2007.

Evolutionary algorithms
Genetic algorithms
Nature-inspired metaheuristics